was a town located in Kōnu District, Hiroshima Prefecture, Japan.

As of November 2021, the town had a population of 1,212 and a density of 17.16 persons per km². The total area was 70.61 km².

On March 31, 2005, Sōryō, along with the towns of Hiwa, Kuchiwa, Saijō, Takano and Tōjō (all from Hiba District), was merged into the expanded city of Shōbara.

External links
 Shōbara official website 

Dissolved municipalities of Hiroshima Prefecture